Konokawauchi Dam  is a rockfill dam located in Miyazaki Prefecture in Japan. The dam is used for irrigation. The catchment area of the dam is 23.5 km2. The dam impounds about 40  ha of land when full and can store 6270 thousand cubic meters of water. The construction of the dam was started on 1983 and completed in 2009.

See also
List of dams in Japan

References

Dams in Miyazaki Prefecture